The Acholibur–Gulu–Olwiyo Road is a road in the Northern Region of Uganda, connecting the town of Acholibur to the city of Gulu and the town of Olwiyo.

Location
The road continues in a southwesterly direction to Gulu (2014 population: 152,276), the most populous city in the Northern Region. The road connects the districts of Kitgum, Pader, Gulu, and Nwoya. The coordinates of the road near Gulu are 2°48'24.0"N, 32°19'29.0"E (Latitude:2.806667; Longitude:32.324722).

Upgrading to bitumen
In 2009, the Ugandan government commissioned a feasibility study and detailed engineering design for both this road and the Rwekunye–Apac–Aduku–Lira–Kitgum–Musingo Road, each in northern Uganda. The reports became available in 2013. On 21 February 2015, the upgrade from unsealed gravel surface to class II bitumen surface was commissioned by President Yoweri Museveni. The  road section from Unyama to Olwiyo was upgraded by Jiangxi Zhongmei Engineering Construction Company Limited. Work was expected to last three years. The road project is fully funded by the Ugandan government.

See also
 List of roads in Uganda
 Economy of Uganda
 Transport in Uganda

References

External links
 Uganda National Road Authority Homepage
 UNRA Promises A Better Road Network

 

Roads in Uganda
Nwoya District
Gulu District
Pader District
Acholi sub-region
Northern Region, Uganda